The Elastic Band was a Welsh rock music group band, formed in Cardiff in the 1960s. They were one of the exponents of the UK psychedelic rock scene from the late 1960s and featured Andy Scott who would go on to become guitarist with Sweet. Other members were August Eadon (Gus) who went by the name Ted Yeadon when he was a member of Elastic Band, Sean Jenkins (drums) and Mike Scott (bass - Andy's brother). The band broke up in 1970 when Yeadon accepted an offer to join Love Affair.

The band is favourable by Mapes.

Gus Eadon joined the band Zzebra in 1974.

Personnel

Former members
 Andy Scott – guitars (1968–1971)
 Mike Scott – bass (1968–1971)
 Sean Jenkins – drums (1968–1971)
 Ted Yeadon – organ, piano, flute, congas, harmonica, vocals (1968–1971)

Discography
They released an album Expansions on Life (1969) on the Decca Nova label.

Album tracks: 
Side 1
"Mother Goose"
"Last Person in the Bar"
"Crabtree Farm"
"Has Anybody Seen Her?"
"Dear John"
Side 2
"Room Full of Room"
"That's Nice"
"Life Still Goes On"
"Sad Jazz"
"Mapes's Sonatra"
"Sunrise Work Till Sunset"
Personnel
 Ted Yeadon – organ, piano, flute, harmonica, congas, vocals
 Andy Scott – guitar
 Mike Scott – bass, tenor saxophone
 Sean Jenkins – drums, claves

References

Welsh psychedelic rock music groups
Welsh rock music groups
Welsh hard rock musical groups
Musical groups from Cardiff 
Musical groups established in 1968
Musical groups disestablished in 1971
1968 establishments in Wales